William Halsall (2 May 1897 – 1968) was an English footballer who played in the Football League for Southport.

References

1897 births
1968 deaths
English footballers
Association football goalkeepers
English Football League players